Nelson Martinez may refer to:

Nelson Martínez (born 1991), Ecuadorian footballer
Nelson Martinez (baritone) (born 1981), Cuban-American baritone player
Nelson Martínez (politician) (1951–2018), Venezuelan politician
Nelson Martinez (soccer) (born 2001), American soccer player